John Forman may refer to:

 John Forman (British politician) (1884–1975), British insurance agent and politician
 John Forman (Nova Scotia politician) (1798–1832), lawyer, judge and political figure in Nova Scotia
 John Forman (martyr) (died 1556), Protestant martyr
 John Forman (sport shooter) (1925–1998), American Olympic shooter
 John Forman (trade unionist) (1823–1900), British trade unionist

See also
 John Foreman (disambiguation)